Extase is a computer game developed by Cryo and published by Virgin Mastertronic.

Summary
It features some puzzles involving a sleeping female android that the player needed to wake up by cleaning its circuit. Each level represented a different level of emotion until the final extase (ecstasy). The gameplay mechanic is based on the "Brain Bowler" minigame in Purple Saturn Day, an 'alien sports' compilation created by the Cryo team under the name ERE and published by Epyx.

The music was designed by Stéphane Picq, and was co-credited to Philippe Eidel, and The Bulgarian Voices. It punctuated each action of the player or each event, becoming gradually richer until the level was finally completed.

Critical reception 
Ace Magazine wrote that the game was highly original, though noted it is one players would either love or hate. Amiga Format described the game as a "musical masterpiece" and "graphic extravaganza".

Legacy
The sleeping female android later became the mascot for Cryo Interactive, and appeared in their many logos.

References

External links

1990 video games
Amiga games
Atari ST games
Cryo Interactive games
Cyberpunk video games
DOS games
Europe-exclusive video games
Video games developed in France
Video games scored by Stéphane Picq
Single-player video games